Santa Fe Relocation is  a Global Mobility company headquartered in London, United Kingdom. They provide moving, destination services, immigration and assignment management services. Throughout the 1900s and in more recent times, a number of companies and corporations have amalgamated to form Santa Fe Relocation. The oldest of Santa Fe's brands is Wridgways, founded in 1892 in Australia.

Santa Fe was founded in 1980, before it was acquired by the East Asiatic Company in 1988. They acquired Australia-based Wridgways in a deal worth AUD 89 million. At the time, they were the only removal company to be listed on the Australian Stock Exchange. They also acquired Interdean, one of Europe's largest removal firms.

Santa Fe's parent company, The East Asiatic Company, changed its name to Santa Fe Group A/S in 2015 but remained listed on the Copenhagen Stock Exchange under the new name.

History
In 1980, Santa Fe was formed in Hong Kong. The removal and relocation experts operated predominately in Asia, before they were acquired by East Asiatic Company in 1988. As part of the deal, a number of EAC employees moved over to the subsidiary, including Lars Lykke Iversen. From that point forward, Santa Fe grew aggressively, acquiring a number of large organisations.

In 1892, Wridgways was founded in Australia. Following World War II, the company felt it was now safe to expand their business into Europe. They opened their first European offices in Germany, in 1959. Three years later, they opened an office in Russia. The company opened offices in Hong Kong in 1980 and mainland China in 1985.

During the 1990s, they were one of the largest removal companies globally and in 1999, became the only removal company to be floated on the Australian Stock Exchange. To date, they are the only removal company to have ever been listed on the Australian Stock Exchange. According to the Sydney Morning Herald, Wridgways always struggled to compete globally and therefore became an attractive acquisition option for global removal firms, as they specialised in a single market. Santa Fe announced they were acquiring the company in 2010.

Santa Fe acquired Interdean a year later in 2011. The company was one of the largest relocation companies in Europe, after they were founded in 1959. They originated in Germany, before expanding into mainland Europe in the 1990s, following the fall of the Berlin Wall.[10] The company was headquartered in London at the time of the acquisition, with 48 offices across Europe and 1,200 employees.[11]

In 2010 and 2011, Santa Fe carried out two major acquisitions. The first was for the Australian-based company, Wridgways, in a deal worth AUD 89 million.[5] The second was for European-based Interdean, raising their staffing levels to over 3,000 globally.

Santa Fe re-branded Interdean to Santa Fe Relocation Services in 2015. In 2017 the company introduced a new logo on their website.

In 2015, Santa Fe Relocation Services announced that it had merged with its parent company EAC and changed the name of the publicly listed company from EAC to Santa Fe Group.

Accreditations
 Fidi
 Worldwide ERC
 EURA (European Relocation Association)

See also
 Moving company
 Hans Niels Andersen
 East Asiatic Company

References

External links
Official Website

Removal companies of the United Kingdom